The Empire World Towers are two proposed supertall skyscrapers to be built in Miami, Florida in the United States. The complex consists of the Empire World Tower I and the Empire World Tower II. If completed, both towers would stand at 1,022 feet (312 m), with 93 stories each. They would surpass the Panorama Tower and become the city and state's tallest buildings, since the approved One Bayfront Plaza has been reduced to a height of 1,010 ft.

If approved, constructed, and completed, the towers will surpass Queensland 1 as the world's tallest all residential buildings, until the completion of the Chicago Spire.

Height
The Empire World Towers were originally proposed to rise 1,200 feet (366 m) and 106 stories.

In December 2007, the height of the towers was decreased to 1,022 feet (312 m). It is probable that the height decrease was brought on due to the concerns raised by the Federal Aviation Administration about the proposed buildings' heights.

See also 
List of tallest buildings in Miami

External links 
Entry on Emporis.com
Entry on Skyscraperpage.com

Residential skyscrapers in Miami
Proposed skyscrapers in the United States
Twin towers